Times Square Red, Times Square Blue is a non-fiction book written by science fiction author Samuel R. Delany and published in 1999 by the New York University Press. The book is a compilation of two separate essays: Times Square Blue and ...Three, Two, One, Contact: Times Square Red. The 20th Anniversary Edition, published in 2019, contains an introduction by Robert Reid-Pharr.

Contents

Times Square Blue
Times Square Blue is a first-hand narrative of Delany's (often referred to as "Chip," or, occasionally, as "The Professor") sexual exploits in Times Square's pornographic movie theaters with other men (some homosexual, some heterosexual) from 1960 through the mid-1990s. He also describes, in detail, his relationships with these men inside and outside the theatres.

...Three, Two, One, Contact: Times Square Red
The second essay in the book discusses the nature of social relations within the realm of urban studies. Delany proposes two kinds of relationships, "contact" and "networking," and analyzes the content and benefits of each. He also refers extensively to Jane Jacobs' The Death and Life of Great American Cities.

Reception
The starred 1999 review in Publishers Weekly describes it as being "a provocative and persuasively argued cri de coeur against New York City's gentrification and the redevelopment of Times Square in the name of 'family values and safety,'...(Delany) writes frankly about his gay sexual adventures in the peep shows, porno movie houses and bars of Times Square. This personal history is juxtaposed with a detailed record of how the city's red light zones have changed over the past 40 years." In Salon, the work is described as "remarkable" and "brilliant."

References

Further reading

1999 non-fiction books
American history books
American memoirs
American political books
Anthropology books
Bisexual non-fiction books
Business books
Books about films
Books about New York City
Books about politics of the United States
Books by Samuel Delany
Books about urbanism
Current affairs books
American essay collections
History books about cities
History books about politics
History books about the United States
Non-fiction books about pornography
Times Square
Urban planning in New York City
New York University Press books
1990s LGBT literature
LGBT literature in the United States